The 2018 Piala Sumbangsih was the 33rd edition of the Piala Sumbangsih, an annual football match played between the winners of the previous season's Malaysia Super League and Malaysia Cup. But since both competitions are won by the same club the previous year, the match will be played against Malaysia FA Cup winner's instead. The game was played between the Kedah FA, winners of the 2017 Malaysia FA Cup, and Johor Darul Ta'zim F.C., champions of the 2017 Malaysia Super League.

Match details

Source:

Winners

References 

Piala Sumbangsih seasons
2018 in Malaysian football